Parachariesthes marshalli is a species of beetle in the family Cerambycidae, and the only species in the genus Parachariesthes. It was described by Stephan von Breuning in 1934.

References

Tragocephalini
Beetles described in 1934